The 2008 Little League Philippine Series was held from April 5 to 13, 2008. The venue of the tournament was the Alabang Country Club in Muntinlupa.  72 teams joined in the various age divisions.  This is an annual event and winners earn the right to represent Little League Philippines at the Asia Pacific Regional Tournaments to be held in June and July.

Little League Baseball (11 to 12 Years Old)

A new tournament format was used in 2008.  The new format is similar to that used in the Mexican Little League tournament.  A total of 29 teams joined.

First round Standings

Second round Standings

Semi-finals

Muntinlupa 20  ILLAM 13

Tanauan, Batangas 13  Bulacan 2

Third Place

Bulacan 12 ILLAM 0

Championship

Tanauan, Batangas 8   Muntinlupa 2

Junior League Baseball (13-14 Years Old)

Championship

ILLAM 16   Muntinlupa 5

Senior League Baseball (14-16 Years Old)

Championship

ILLAM 14   Tanauan 2

Big League Baseball (16-18 Years Old)

Championship

ILLAM 1   Makati 0

Little League Softball (11-12 Years Old)

Championship

Bacolod West 7    Cavite 2

Junior League Softball (13-14 Years Old)

Championship

Bacolod West 5   ILLAM 3

Senior League Softball (13-16 Years Old)

Championship

Bacolod West 8   Muntinlupa 0

Big League Softball (14-18 Years Old)

Championship

Manila 9   ILLAM 1

See also
 2009 Little League Philippine Series

References
http://sports.inquirer.net/breakingnews/breakingnews/view_article.php?article_id=128576
http://pinoybasebol.wordpress.com/
https://web.archive.org/web/20080323124138/http://muntinlupalittleleague.org/gameday/philseriesteaser.html
http://www.journal.com.ph/index.php?issue=2008-04-03&sec=7&aid=54727 
https://web.archive.org/web/20090505163203/http://www.sunstar.com.ph/static/bac/2008/04/16/sports/bacolod.softbelles.dominate.rp.s.little.league.series.html
https://web.archive.org/web/20080411020717/http://littleleaguephilippines.typepad.com/
http://www.yehey.com/sports/full_article.aspx?id=209636
http://www.philstar.com/index.php?Sports&p=49&type=2&sec=30&aid=20080714123
https://web.archive.org/web/20080803233253/http://sports.inquirer.net/inquirersports/inquirersports/view/20080715-148505/PSC-hits-out-at-Bacolod-softball-execs
http://www.businessmirror.com.ph/06172008/sports04.html

External links
http://www.littleleague.org/
https://web.archive.org/web/20080501121939/http://www.muntinlupalittleleague.org/
2008 Little League World Series
https://web.archive.org/web/20080725045412/http://www.littleleague.org/series/2008divisions/llsb/qualify/fareast.htm
https://web.archive.org/web/20080718221308/http://www.littleleague.org/series/2008divisions/jlsb/qualify/fareast.htm
https://web.archive.org/web/20080725045452/http://www.littleleague.org/series/2008divisions/slsb/qualify/fareast.htm
https://web.archive.org/web/20080801051652/http://www.littleleague.org/series/2008divisions/blsb/qualify/fareast.htm
https://web.archive.org/web/20080715231125/http://www.littleleague.org/series/2008divisions/jlbb/qualify/fareast.htm
https://web.archive.org/web/20080715231225/http://www.littleleague.org/series/2008divisions/slbb/qualify/fareast.htm
https://web.archive.org/web/20080715231055/http://www.littleleague.org/series/2008divisions/blbb/qualify/fareast.htm

Baseball competitions in the Philippines
>
2008 in Philippine sport